Zakary Zidane Guerfi (Arabic: زاك القرفي; born 11 October 1998) is a semi-professional footballer who last played as a midfielder for Potters Bar Town. Born in England, he represents Tunisia at international level.

Club career
Guerfi started his career with Stevenage, joining the under-12 side in 2012. He enjoyed a brief loan with Bedford Town in December 2016, before a move to Bishop's Stortford ahead of the 2017–18 campaign. Guerfi went onto feature for the likes of Codicote and Biggleswade United before making the move to Sweden to join fourth-tier side, Bodens BK in 2018. During his debut season in Scandinavia, Guerfi was part of the side which gained promotion to the Swedish third-tier, Division 1. This triumph was rewarded with a move in July 2019 to top-flight side, US Monastir, a team native to Tunisia. However, seven months into his stay at the club and without a single appearance to his name, Guerfi had his contract terminated following disputes concerning his salary between the club and player.

Upon his return to England, Guerfi joined Essex-based side, Braintree Town in February 2020, featuring three times before the COVID-19 pandemic curtailed the remainder of the 2019–20 campaign. Following a short-term spell with Sevenoaks Town in October 2020, Guerfi made the move back to the National League South to join Tonbridge Angels, in which his stay was heavily disrupted once again by the COVID-19 pandemic as he featured eight times in all competitions before leaving for Cray Wanderers and then subsequently Leatherhead in October and November of 2021. In February 2022, he was playing for Potters Bar Town. Guerfi went onto feature eighteen times, scoring once for the club before announcing his departure in May 2022.

International career
Guerfi made his Tunisia under-18 bow in 2016 as a sixteen-year old, featuring against Egypt under-18s. In June 2019, Guerfi was called up to the Tunisia senior squad and was an unused substitute in a 2–0 friendly win over Iraq.

Career statistics

References

1998 births
Living people
Footballers from Greater London
Tunisian footballers
Tunisia youth international footballers
English footballers
English people of Tunisian descent
Association football midfielders
Stevenage F.C. players
Bedford Town F.C. players
Bishop's Stortford F.C. players
Biggleswade United F.C. players
Bodens BK players
US Monastir (football) players
Braintree Town F.C. players
Sevenoaks Town F.C. players
Tonbridge Angels F.C. players
Cray Wanderers F.C. players
Leatherhead F.C. players
Potters Bar Town F.C. players
Southern Football League players
Division 2 (Swedish football) players
Ettan Fotboll players
National League (English football) players
Isthmian League players
Tunisian expatriate footballers
English expatriate footballers
Tunisian expatriates in Sweden
English expatriate sportspeople in Sweden
Expatriate footballers in Sweden